Franckh-Kosmos Verlags-GmbH & Co. is a media publishing house based in Stuttgart, Germany, founded in 1822 by Johann Friedrich Franckh. In the nineteenth century the company published the fairy tales of Wilhelm Hauff as well as works by Wilhelm Waiblinger and Eduard Mörike. 

The "Friends of Nature Club" was set up in 1903 in response to booming public interest in science and technology, and by 1912 100,000 members were receiving its monthly magazine "Cosmos" (Kosmos).  The company moved into publishing books on popular science topics under the brands Franckh’sche Verlagshandlung and KOSMOS, including successful non-fiction guidebooks by Hanns Günther and Heinz Richter.  Children's fiction and Kosmos-branded science experimentation kits were introduced in the 1920s.

Kosmos's current output includes non-fiction, children's books, science kits and German-style board games.  Many of their games are translated into English and published by Thames & Kosmos. Their line of experiment kits and science kits is distributed in North America and the United Kingdom by Thames & Kosmos.

Notable games 
 Beowulf: The Legend
 Exit: The Game
 Jambo
 Lord of the Rings
 Lost Cities
 The Settlers of Catan
 TwixT

External links
 

Board game publishing companies
Children's book publishers
Publishing companies of Germany
Toy companies of Germany
Construction toys
Toy companies established in the 19th century
Manufacturing companies established in 1822
Publishing companies established in 1822
German companies established in 1822